Isle Land is a DVD EP recorded and filmed on Vashon Island. It was released by Bella Union.

Track listing
 "Vacilando Territory"
 "Vessels"
 "Barter Blues"
 "No Occasion"

References

External links
J. Tillman official website
Bella Union Records

Bella Union albums
Josh Tillman albums
2009 EPs